Iranaq (also Romanized as Īrānaq; also known as Irāna, Iranagh, Īrānak, and Iraniq) is a village in Shebli Rural District, in the Central District of Bostanabad County, East Azerbaijan Province, Iran. At the 2006 census, its population was 2,616, in 602 families.

References 

Populated places in Bostanabad County